Mungu Crater is a volcanic crater in Oljoro ward and Mateves ward in Arusha Rural District located in Arusha Region, Tanzania. Inside the crater is surrounded by forest whilst the crater floor is a seasonal swamp.

References

Geography of Arusha Region
Volcanic craters